George I Rákóczi (8 June 1593 – 11 October 1648) was Prince of Transylvania from 1630 until his death in 1648. Prior to that, he was a leader of the Protestant faction in Hungary and a faithful supporter of Gabriel Bethlen, his predecessor as Prince. When Bohemian nobles requested military support in their struggles against the Habsburg monarchy, Rákóczi persuaded Bethlen to help and commanded Transylvanian forces in several battles. Rákóczi was elected prince after Bethlen's death, succeeding Bethlen's wife Catherine of Brandenburg and brother Istvan.

Early life 

George was the eldest son of Baron Sigismund Rákóczi and his second wife, Anna Gerendi. Sigismund, who was a successful military commander in Royal Hungary, was the first member of the Rákóczi family to rise to prominence. George was born in Szerencs on 8 June 1593. His mother died in 1595.

George's childhood is almost undocumented. His father sent him to Kassa (now Košice in Slovakia) in late 1604 or early 1605. Kassa was the seat of Stephen Bocskai, who had rebelled against the Habsburg ruler of Royal Hungary, Rudolph. Through sending George to Kassa, Sigismund demonstrated his support to Bocskai who made him the governor of the Principality of Transylvania in September 1605.

Bocskai named Bálint Drugeth as his successor in Transylvania on his deathbead, but the Diet of Transylvania elected Sigismund prince on 12 February 1606. After his election, Sigismund first drank George's health. Gabriel Báthory, who laid claim to Transylvania, made an alliance with the irregular Hajdú troops. Sigismund was forced to abdicate in Báthory's favor on 5 March 1608. Although Sigismund lost the throne, his short reign in Transylvania strengthened his sons' position, because no other noblemen could demonstrate a princely origin. George went to Pressburg (now Bratislava in Slovakia) to represent his ailing father at the Diet of Hungary in September 1608. He was still at the Diet when his father died on 5 December.

Wealthy nobleman 

George and his two brothers, Zsigmond and Pál, inherited their father's vast estates in Royal Hungary. Bálint Drugeth (who was the husband of their eldest sister), their father's widow, Borbála Telegdy, and her son-in-law, István Kendi, sued them for parts of their inheritance. To secure the support of the monarch, George went to the royal court at Prague in spring 1611. He also cooperated with György Thurzó, Palatine of Hungary, against the Hajdús.

George was made the ispán (or head) of Borsod County in 1615. A year later, he was appointed the captain of the royal castle at Ónod. He married a wealthy heiress, Zsuzsanna Lorántffy. He would emphasize in his last will that his wife was the most beautiful and pleasant woman whom he met in his life. They settled in Szerencs, but later moved to her inherited estate, Sárospatak. They were enthusiastic adherents of the Reformed Church. He supported Gabriel Bethlen, the Calvinist Prince of Transylvania, against the Catholic pretender, György Drugeth. When Drugeth was planning to break into Transylvania, George visited Bethlen in July 1616.

Rudolph's successor, Matthias II, favored the Catholic noblemen, although most Hungarian noblemen adhered to Protestantism. The childless monarch's designated heir, Ferdinand, was notorious for his strong commitment to Counter-Reformation. Matthias was still alive when Ferdinand was crowned king of Hungary at the Diet in Pressburg on 1 July 1618. George was absent from the Diet.

The Habsburg monarchs' Anti-Protestant measures had outraged the predominantly Protestant Bohemian noblemen. Their representatives broke into the Prague Castle and threw Matthias's two Catholic lieutenants out of a window on 22 May 1618. The Bohemian rebels sent envoys to the Protestant countries, seeking assistance against the Habsburgs.

The Habsburgs' Anti-Protestant policy annoyed George who was a leader of the Hungarian Protestants. He urged Gabriel Bethlen to intervene in the conflict on behalf of the Bohemian rebels. He also started to hire Hajdú troops in summer 1619. To prevent Rákóczi and Bethlen's cooperation, András Dóczy, the commander of the royal troops in Upper Hungary, offered Rákóczi's estates to Bethlen on the king's behalf. Instead of accepting Dóczy's offer, Bethlen informed Rákóczi that he had decided to invade Royal Hungary. To facilitate Bethlen's invasion, Rákóczi tried to capture Drugeth, but he could not prevent him from fleeing to Poland. Then Rákóczi marched to Kassa and persuaded the predominantly Evangelical (or Lutheran) burghers to surrender on 5 September. A day later, his Hajdú troops tortured and murdered three Jesuit priests, Melchior Grodziecki, Marko Krizin and Stephen Pongracz.

Rákóczi returned to Sárospatak to meet with Bethlen who arrived at the head of the Transylvanian army on 17 September. They went to Kassa where Bethlen held an assembly with the deputies of the noblemen and towns of Upper Hungary. The deputies elected Rákóczi the commander of Upper Hungary on 21 September. He established his seat in Kassa. Drugeth hired irregular troops (primarily Cossacks) in Poland and broke into Zemplén County on 21 November. Rákóczi tried to stop their invasion, but he was defeated in the Battle of Humenné on 23 November. Bethlen soon lifted the siege of Vienna and hurried back to Hungary. He blamed Rákóczi for the defeat, describing him as a young and inexperienced commander in a letter to the burghers of Kassa.

Drugeth's troops plundered the region of Kassa, but they could not capture the town. Rákóczi ordered the mobilization of the local troops. The Cossacks left Hungary before the end of 1619, and Drugeth followed them to Poland in early next year. Ferdinand's army laid siege to Pressburg in October, but Rákóczi hurried to the town and forced the invaders to lift the siege. However, Ferdinand's troops inflicted a decisive defeat on the Bohemian army in the Battle of White Mountain on 8 November. His commander, Bucquoy, invaded Upper Hungary, forcing Bethlen to withdraw his troops as far as Kassa in the first half of 1621. Most Hungarian noblemen sought a reconciliation with Ferdinand, but Rákóczi remained loyal to Bethlen. After Bethlen's opponents seized the fortress of Fülek (now Fiľakovo in Slovakia), Rákóczi laid siege to it in April, but he could not force the defenders to surrender. Bethlen launched a counter-attack against Ferdinand's army in August. Rákóczi joined the military campaign and participated in the siege of Pressburg, but he returned to his family to Sárospatak in late August, only to return a month later at Bethlen's demand.

Bethlen and Ferdinand concluded a peace treaty in January 1622. The Peace of Nikolsburg authorized Bethlen to rule seven counties in Hungary—Abaúj, Bereg, Borsod, Szabolcs, Szatmár, Ugocsa and Zemplén—till the end of his life.

George remained in Bethlen's service till Bethlen died in 1629. Bethlen was briefly succeeded by his widow Catherine, and then his brother Istvan. But the Transylvanian Estates soon turned to George instead. On 1 December 1630, at Sighisoara, the Estates elected Rákóczi as Prince; he ruled until his death in 1648.

In 1644, he intervened in the Thirty Years War, declaring war against Emperor Ferdinand III. He took the whole of Upper Hungary and joined the Swedish army besieging Brno for a projected march against Vienna. However, his nominal overlord, the Ottoman Sultan, ordered him to end the campaign. In the Treaty of Linz (1645), Ferdinand recognized George's rule over the seven counties of the Partium and reaffirmed the religious liberties of Transylvania.

Family 

György was married to Zsuzsanna Lorántffy. They had four sons:

Samuel (1617–1618)
George Rákóczi II (1621–1660)
Sigismund Rákóczi (1622–1652), who married Henriette Marie of the Palatinate  
Frank (1624–1632)

Citations

Sources 
 
 
 
 
 
Szilagyi, Sandor(1893) Elsö Rákóczy György, 1593-1648.Magyart Történelmi Társulat, Budapest 482 p  
 

Monarchs of Transylvania
1593 births
1648 deaths
People from Szerencs
17th-century Hungarian people
George 01